Anne Douglas Sedgwick (28 March 1873 – 19 July 1935) was an American-born British writer.  The daughter of George Stanley Sedgwick, a businessman and Mary (Douglas) Sedgwick, she was born in Englewood, New Jersey but at age nine her family moved to London. Although she made return visits to the United States, she lived in England for the remainder of her life.

In 1908, she married the British essayist and journalist, Basil de Sélincourt.  During World War I she and her husband were volunteer workers in hospitals and orphanages in France.

Her novels explored the contrast in values between Americans and Europeans.  Her best-selling novel Tante was made into a 1919 film, The Impossible Woman, and The Little French Girl into a 1925 film of the same name.  In 1931, she was elected to the United States National Institute of Arts and Letters.  Four of her books were on the list of bestselling novels in the United States for 1912, 1924, 1927, and 1929 as determined by The New York Times.

Sedgwick died in Hampstead, England in 1935. The following year her husband published Anne Douglas Sedgwick: A Portrait in Letters.

Bibliography

 The Dull Miss Archinard (1898)
 The Confounding of Camelia (1899)
 The Rescue (1902)
 Paths of Judgement (1904)
 The Shadow of Life (1906)
 A Fountain Sealed (1907)
 Valerie Upton (1908)
 Amabel Channice (1908)
 Franklin Winslow Kane (1910)
 Tante  (1912)  – No.9 for the year in the U.S.
 The Nest  (collection of short stories) (1913)
 The Encounter  (1914)
 A Childhood in Brittany Eighty Years Ago  (nonfiction) (1919)
 The Third Window  (1920)
 Christmas Roses and Other Stories (1920)
 Adrienne Toner  (1922)
 The Little French Girl  (1924)  – No.3 for the year in the U.S.
 The Old Countess  (1927) – No.9 for the year in the U.S.
 Dark Hester  (1929) – No.3 for the year in the U.S.
 Philippa  (1929)

References

External links 

 
 
 
 
 
 

1873 births
1935 deaths
19th-century British novelists
19th-century British women writers
20th-century British novelists
20th-century British women writers
American emigrants to England
British women novelists
People from Englewood, New Jersey